Caroline Chisholm School is a mixed all-through school with academy status, in Wootton, south Northampton, England. It is named after Caroline Chisholm, a 19th-century social reformer. The principal is David James. The school was built in 15 months and cost £25 million. The school added its final year, Year 13, in September 2008. In 2005, admission arrangements were changed to give siblings of existing students at the school greater priority for places.

Design
The school has 5 blocks, A Block (Music, Drama and PE), B Block (Languages and Humanities), C Block (Maths and English), D Block (Technology and Science), E Block (Sixth Form Centre, ICT, Business and Art). The school also boasts a two-form entry Primary Phase with its own studio, multi-purpose room, 12 classrooms and large playground area. The site also has a cafeteria, takeaway area, numerous ICT suites, drama studios, gym, art display area, and public meeting rooms.

Distinctions
 This was the first through 4-18 state school in the UK.
 The school was mentioned in the House of Lords when it was confirmed that this was one of just six schools in England defined as a middle school that educates Year 11 pupils.
 Education Secretary Ruth Kelly visited the school on 17 March 2005.

Community involvement
The school is in the Wooldale Centre for Learning, a multi-use community facility. Caroline Chisholm has been described as "unique and ground
breaking" for the way it is linked into the community including offering sports and learning facilities for the whole community.
Kajima Community manage the busy community activities during the evenings and weekends - www.ccs.schoolbookings.co.uk.

Academic standards
Ofsted's report of 17 May 2006 describes the school as: 

It had 'outstanding' outcome from its Ofsted report in July 2009, while they received a 'good' outcome from their Ofsted report in 2012. Caroline Chisholm school received 'requires improvement' by Ofsted in 2018. In their latest report in January 2020, the school received a 'good' rating with an 'outstanding' Early Years Foundation Stage.

Catchment area row
Although the area is next to the large housing development of Grange Park, a proposal in January 2010 by Northamptonshire County Council to remove Woodland View Primary School in Grange Park as a feeder school provoked huge protest from Grange Park parents. The alternative schools proposed were Roade School Sports College and Abbeyfield School. (formerly Mereway Secondary School).

References

External links
 Official site

Academies in West Northamptonshire District
Educational institutions established in 2004
Primary schools in West Northamptonshire District
Secondary schools in West Northamptonshire District
2004 establishments in England
Hackleton